The Duchy of Saxe-Merseburg was a duchy of the Holy Roman Empire, with Merseburg as its capital.  It existed from 1656 or 1657 to 1738 and was owned by an Albertine secundogeniture of the Saxon House of Wettin.

History 

The Wettin Elector John George I of Saxony stipulated in his will dated 20 July 1652 that his three younger sons should receive secundogeniture principalities.  After the elector died on 8 October 1656, his sons concluded the "friend-brotherly main treaty" in the Saxon residence of Dresden on 22 April 1657 and a further treaty in 1663 delineating their territories and sovereign rights definitively.  The treaties created three duchies: Saxe-Zeitz, Saxe-Weissenfels, and Saxe-Merseburg.

Prince Christian, the third eldest son, received, among other properties, the estates of the former Bishopric of Merseburg, secularised in 1565: the castles, cities and districts of Merseburg, Plagwitz, Rückmarsdorf, Delitzsch (with Delitzsch Castle), Bad Lauchstädt, Schkeuditz, Lützen, Bitterfeld, Zörbig, the County of Brehna as well as the Margraviate of Lower Lusatia, including the cities and castles of Lübben, Doberlug, Finsterwalde, Döbern, Forst and Guben.  Many of these territories had belonged to the Diocese of Merseburg until it was secularized in 1562.

The area of Saxe-Merseburg stretched to the western city limits of Leipzig.  The customs station was in what is now the inner city district of Lindenau.

After the death of the last male heir of the Saxon branch line in 1738, the Duchy of Saxe-Merseburg fell back to the Electorate of Saxony.

Rulers 

 1656-1691 Christian I (born: 27 October 1615 in Dresden; died: 18 October 1691 in Merseburg)
 1691-1694 Christian II (born: 19 November 1653 in Merseburg; died: 20 October 1694 in Merseburg)
 1694 Christian III Maurice (born: 7 November 1680 in Merseburg; died: 14 November 1694 in Merseburg), under the regency of Elector Frederick August I of Saxony and the guardianship of his mother Erdmuthe Dorothea of Saxe-Zeitz
 1694-1731 Maurice Wilhelm (born: 5 February 1688 in Merseburg; died: 21 April 1731 in Merseburg), until 1712 under the regency of Elector Frederick August I of Saxony and the guardianship of his mother Erdmuthe Dorothea of Saxe-Zeitz
 1731-1738 Heinrich (born: 2 September 1661 in Merseburg; died: 28 July 1738 in Doberlug), previously already Duke of Saxe-Merseburg-Spremberg

Cadet lines 
To supply his three younger sons with incomes befitting a duke, Duke Christian I created apanages for his younger sons during his lifetime.  These territories remained dependent on the main line and their sovereignty was severely restricted.  They were named after their owner's residences and disappeared with the death of their first duke, because none of them fathered surviving male heirs.  Before it died out, the Saxe-Merseburg-Spremberg line inherited all of Saxe-Merseburg.

 Until 1715 August (born: 15 February 1655 in Merseburg; died: 27 March 1715 in Zörbig), Duke of Saxe-Merseburg-Zörbig
 Until 1690 Philipp (born: 26 October 1657 in Merseburg; died: 1 July 1690 in Fleurus), Duke of Saxe-Merseburg-Lauchstädt
 Until 1731 Heinrich (born: 2 September 1661 in Merseburg; died: 28 July 1738 in Doberlug), Duke of Saxe-Merseburg-Spremberg until 1731, inherited Saxe-Merseburg in 1731

References 
 Martina Schattkowsky/Manfred Wilde (Hg.): Sachsen und seine Sekundogenituren. Die Nebenlinien Weißenfels, Merseburg und Zeitz (1657–1746). Schriften zur Sächsischen Geschichte und Volkskunde, Band 33. Leipziger Universitätsverlag, Leipzig 2010, .
 Manfred Wilde: Das Barockschloss Delitzsch als Witwensitz der Herzöge von Sachsen-Merseburg. In: Barocke Fürstenresidenzen an Saale, Unstrut und Elster, edited by the Museumsverbund Die fünf Ungleichen, Michael Imhof Verlag, Petersberg 2007, .

External links 
 Johann Huebner ... Three hundred and thirty-three Genealogical Tables, Table 170

 
Former states and territories of Saxony-Anhalt
Merseburg
1657 establishments in the Holy Roman Empire
1738 disestablishments in the Holy Roman Empire
States and territories established in 1657
House of Wettin